Nahapetavan is a village in the Artik Municipality of the Shirak Province of Armenia. The town was renamed in 1961 in honor of Nahapet Kurghinian, a participant in the Bolshevik uprising in May 1920.

Demographics

References 

Populated places in Shirak Province